The Nickelodeon Kids' Choice Awards, also known as the KCAs or Kids' Choice, is an annual American children's awards ceremony show produced by Nickelodeon. Usually held on a Saturday night in March or early April, the show honors the year's biggest in television, film, music, and sports as voted by viewers worldwide of Nickelodeon networks. Winners receive a hollow orange blimp figurine, a logo outline for much of the network's 1984–2009 era, which also functions as a kaleidoscope.

The show features numerous celebrity guests and musical acts. Since 2002, slime stunts have been incorporated into the show. The KCAs also host live entertainment. It has also been known to cover people with the network's trademark green slime. The animated series SpongeBob SquarePants has won the most KCA awards, with nineteen overall through the series' run. Individually, Selena Gomez has won the most trophies with twelve, followed by Will Smith and Adam Sandler (both with 11) as well as Justin Bieber and Ariana Grande (both with 9). Whoopi Goldberg is the only person to have won a Kids' Choice Award, alongside the prevailing "EGOT" combination of an Emmy, Grammy, Oscar, and Tony. Rosie O'Donnell has hosted the show eight times, followed by Jack Black who hosted three times, as well as Candace Cameron, Whitney Houston, and John Cena who each hosted twice.

History
Alan Goodman, Albie Hecht, and Fred Seibert created the awards show after Nickelodeon produced a segment called The Big Ballot for the movie review show Rated K: For Kids by Kids in 1987, named for the ballots kids voted with. To vote, the viewers would send in ballots and then before the show, the ballots would be counted and the winners would tape a "thank you" video that would be shown during the program. Goodman, Hecht, and Seibert felt that the network needed a bigger, more exciting platform.

Hecht selected the awards logo from a series of network designs created by original logo designers Tom Corey and Scott Nash (Corey McPherson Nash, Boston), overseen by Goodman and Seibert (Fred/Alan, Inc., New York). The award was configured into the current blimp shape/kaleidoscope in 1990. The only change to the award since then has been a change to the embossed logotype on the side of the trophy for 2010 to fit the network's new logo typeface.

As the Internet came into widespread use, the voting finally moved from a combination of 900 number telephone voting and filling paper ballots that were either mailed or completed at Pizza Hut locations, to being conducted exclusively on the network's website, and included text messaging by 2007. During the early years of Internet voting, there were several issues, including the digital equivalent of ballot stuffing and adult voting. As a result, a new system was put into place where one vote per Nick.com account is allowed (although it is probable adults still cast votes via the texting option, which is connected to a phone number only instead of a screen name, by creating an account with a false age, or by having their children vote for a chosen subject instead). In 2010, an iPhone application and mobile browser voting were also added.

The 2009 Kids' Choice Awards featured a new award called "The Big Green Help Award" which goes to the celebrity who goes above and beyond to help the Earth. The inaugural award was presented to Leonardo DiCaprio. For the 2010 awards, "The Big Green Help" award was renamed "The Big Help" award, with First Lady Michelle Obama winning the first award under the rename.

Unlike traditional awards shows, the Kids' Choice Awards uses other items to announce an award winner instead of a traditional envelope. The show sometimes uses balloons, T-shirts, models, giant letters, stickers, and even a foot.

Voting became available for Canadian people in time for the 2010 ceremony, owing to the inauguration of Nickelodeon's Canadian service in November 2009.

The 2020 ceremony was held in a virtual format in the wake of the COVID-19 pandemic.

International history
In June 2010, Nickelodeon Latin America announced a Kids' Choice Awards for Mexico. Other countries with their own Kids' Choice Awards include Brazil, United Kingdom, Australia, and Indonesia, which are either fully original local productions, or inserted as continuity during their broadcast of the U.S. ceremony. The Australian Kids' Choice Awards had its final local ceremony in 2012.

In August 2011, Nickelodeon Latin America announced a Kids' Choice Awards event for Argentina.

In June 2014, Nickelodeon Latin America announced a Kids' Choice Awards event for Colombia.

Awards

This table shows the awards from the past. An asterisk next to a category indicates an award has been presented in that particular category every year since the inception of the Kids' Choice Awards in 1988.

Ceremonies 

Notes

Venues 

The Kids' Choice Awards are typically held in and around Southern California. Past ceremonies have been held at the Barker Hangar in Santa Monica, California, the Hollywood Bowl, the Grand Olympic Auditorium in Los Angeles, and Universal Studios Hollywood in Universal City, but mostly at Pauley Pavilion on the UCLA campus. After renovations to Pauley beginning in 2011, the show was moved to the Galen Center at USC; it was expected to be a temporary home, but the network retained Galen for the 2012–2014 ceremonies due to the construction of the Meyer and Renee Luskin Conference and Guest Center, making it difficult to have the "Orange Carpet"; the smaller Kids' Choice Sports had its first ceremony in 2014 at Pauley. For the 2015 and 2016 shows, the ceremony occurred at the remodeled Forum in Inglewood, California. Between the 2017 and 2019 shows, the venue alternated between the Galen Center and The Forum. The 2023 ceremony was held at the Microsoft Theater.

The 2020 awards, previously scheduled for March 22, were postponed due to the COVID-19 pandemic; the ceremony was later moved to May 2 to be held virtually. The 2020 show was originally planned to serve as a tie-in with Nickelodeon's Slimefest event.

Multiple year hosts 
The ceremony has been hosted multiple times by five individuals: Candace Cameron who hosted in 1990 and 1994, Whitney Houston who hosted consecutively in 1995 and 1996, Rosie O'Donnell who hosted consecutively from 1996 through 2003 (co-hosted with Houston in 1996 and with four co-hosts in 2000), Jack Black who hosted in 2006, 2008 and 2011, and John Cena who hosted consecutively in 2017 and 2018.

Special awards
Recipients of these special awards do not win orange blimps like for the regular awards.

The Hall of Fame Award
The Hall of Fame Award was a gold version of the blimp award from 1991–2000, and was presented to those whose accomplishments, fame, and popularity set them above everyone else. Initially, the award was chosen by the kids from a slate of nominees. Actors, athletes, and singers were all eligible for the award, with ballots containing nominees from multiple categories.

The Wannabe Award
The Wannabe Award was a silver version of the blimp award from 2001–2008, and was presented to the best celebrity role model or inspiration (or the person whom the kids want to be like). The winner was determined prior to the awards without voter input. The only person to have won the Wannabe award and the Hall of Fame award is Will Smith.

The Big Help Award
The Big Green Help Award (later titled as The Big Help Award) was an award presented to a person who goes above and beyond to help the environment. It is based on Nickelodeon's The Big Help initiative. The award was originally green when first awarded in 2009, but later changed to silver along with a name change of the award the following years.

Lifetime Achievement Award
The Nickelodeon Lifetime Achievement Award is a golden version of the blimp award. In 2023, a normal orange-colored blimp award was used.

In 2014, the award was given to television producer Dan Schneider, who created multiple shows at Nickelodeon. During the presentation of his award, Schneider was joined onstage by cast members of his shows including Kenan & Kel, Drake & Josh, Zoey 101, iCarly, Victorious, and Sam & Cat. In 2023, the award was given to Transformers character Optimus Prime. In his acceptance speech, Prime proclaimed for the award to, "...seal the bond between humans, Maximals, and Autobots, as we fight together to protect the planet."

Generation Change Award
The Generation Change Award is presented to those who have worked to bring positive changes for the new generation of kids. The award was originally introduced in the 2019 Kids' Choice Sports ceremony, but has since carried over to the main ceremony.

King of Comedy

Kids' Choice Sports
In July 2014, Nickelodeon presented the first annual Kids' Choice Sports, honoring kids' favorite athletes, teams, and sports moments from the year. Michael Strahan produced and hosted the inaugural ceremony.

Ceremonies

Slimed celebrities

During a ceremony, sometimes a celebrity presenter or award winner might not know when they are going to be slimed onstage or offstage, though as the years went on, getting slimed became more of an honor, and less of a comedic humiliation akin to the early Nickelodeon series You Can't Do That on Television, from whence the concept originated.
Hosts of the show have also been slimed, and occasionally celebrities not attending the awards have been slimed via video segment, such as when Rosie O'Donnell tricked Melissa Joan Hart into getting slimed on the set of Sabrina the Teenage Witch in 2001, or when Amanda Seyfried and Josh Hutcherson were slimed at a KCA watch party in 2013. Celebrities sitting in the audience are also fair game for being slimed, as Mandy Moore first learned in 2007, and Halle Berry later found out in 2012.

Below is a list of all the celebrities that have been slimed over the past years at the Kids' Choice Awards.

Slime stunts
Beginning in 2002, the show began its annual World Record Slime Stunts. Olympians, extreme sports stars and daredevils participated in special stunts performed live on national television—often landing into the trademark green slime.

References

 
1987 establishments in the United States
American annual television specials
American television awards
Awards established in 1987
Kids' Choice Awards